Loya, Łoya or Lóya is a surname in several languages, including Spanish, French, Italian, Plautdietsch, Ukrainian, Bielorrusian and Indian Languages. It may refer to:

Brijgopal Harkishan Loya, Indian judge
Fred Loya (born 1939), American businessman
Javier Loya (born 1986), American boxer
Joe Loya (born 1961), American writer
Mariana Loya (born 1979), American beauty queen
Oscar Loya (born 1979), American singer and actor
Raul Loya (1938–2015), American labor activist

See also
Loya jirga, type of assembly in Afghanistan
Loya Paktia, a region of Afghanistan

Spanish-language surnames